Agrocar (ΑΓΡΟΚΑΡ) was the brand name used by Athens-based G. Makris – E. Ladopoulos O.E., a small company producing agricultural equipment; trucks, mostly used by farmers around Greece, were also produced for a few years. The trucks, classified in Greece as “agricultural machinery”, were introduced in the early 1970s, and used Mercedes-Benz engines and certain mechanical parts by Jeep.

References/External links 
L.S. Skartsis and G.A. Avramidis, "Made in Greece", Typorama, Patras, Greece (2003)  (republished by the University of Patras Science Park, 2007) 
Agrocar Trucks in Dutch Auto Catalog

Defunct motor vehicle manufacturers of Greece
Truck manufacturers of Greece
Panel trucks